Buddhimantudu is a 1969 Indian Telugu-language drama film directed by Bapu. It stars Akkineni Nageswara Rao, Vijaya Nirmala, Sobhan Babu and Krishnam Raju, with music composed by K. V. Mahadevan. The film was remade in Tamil as Manidhanum Dheivamagalam (1975) and in Hindi by the same director as Paramaatma (1994).

Plot
In a village, Madhavacharya, an ardent devotee of Lord Krishna, works as a temple priest, everyone in the village admires him as they believe that he encounters the Lord. Madhavaiah too gets mystic experiences whenever he views Lord's statue whereas, his younger brother, Gopi a riff-raff who spends life as the frolic. Nevertheless, he is kind at heart and struggles for the welfare of the villagers. Seshadri, the village head is a baseness person who creates a lot of atrocities to which Gopi stands as a barrier while Madhavaiah believes him as a wise person and respects him. Meanwhile, Gopi falls in love with a charming girl Radha daughter of Seshadri's sister Kaveramma, in her acquaintance, Gopi reforms and turns into a straight arrow. Eventually, Krishna, son of Seshadri walks in his father's footsteps and traps the village School Teacher's daughter Kasturi. Now Gopi & Radha decide to pair up but they are afraid of their elders' casteism yet, stand strong.

At that time, Gopi's old friends' forcibly take him to carouse. Exploiting it, Seshadri poses Gopi as debauchery before Radha when she loathes him. Even Madhavaiah also necks out him on the provocation of Seshadri and gives their old ruined building as his share. Ahead, malevolent Seshadri scatters bad propaganda against Radha and denounces Gopi which leads to Kaveramma's death. Right now, Seshadri plans to perform Radha's marriage with Krishna to grab her property. Parallelly, Gopi renovates his building and transforms it into a school building to service the villagers. Due to this Seshadri removes Madhavaiah as the priest and handovers the keys. Distressed Madhavaiah goes into illusion and feels as if Lord Krishna too accompanied him. Knowing it, furious Gopi revolts against Seshadri to get back the keys when Seshadri intrigues by stealing the temple ornaments and orders his henchmen Ramalingam (Allu Ramalingaiah) to bury them in the Gopi's premises. But cunning Ramalingam double-crosses and snatches the jewelry. The next day, Gopi is indicted and when they are in search, a treasure of Madhavaiah & Gopi's ancestors is dug out where both the brothers argue to utilize it one for the temple and another for the school.

At that moment, Seshadri again ploys to capture the treasure, so, decides to conduct the elections, and both the parties strongly campaign. Here Gopi breaks out the secret of temple robbery through Ramalingam when Radha learns the virtue of Gopi. During that time, Krishna runs away with the treasure and kidnaps Radha when Gopi rescues and makes Krishna aware of his mistake. Then, Gopi's group without his knowledge challenges Madhavaiah to show a miracle by lifting the dome of the temple into the air if God exists which Madhavaiah accepts and Seshadri accuses him of the act. Disturbed Madhavaiah locks himself in the temple where Lord Krishna also preaches to him that God will not respond to evildoers when Madhavaiah protests against Lord. At that juncture, Gopi understands his brother will not survive until the miracle happens, so, he lifts the dome from the backside of the temple. Immediately, Madhavaiah cools down and when he spots Gopi, enlightens that Lord performed the miracle through his brother and also realizes serving people is equivalent to offering God. At last, they utilize the treasure for the welfare of the people, and Seshadri gets arrested. Finally, the movie ends on a happy note with the marriage of Gopi & Radha.

Cast

Akkineni Nageswara Rao as Madhavacharya & Gopi (Dual role)
Vijaya Nirmala as Radha
Sobhan Babu as Lord Krishna
Krishnam Raju as Krishna 
Gummadi as D.E.O.
Nagabhushanam as Sheshadri
Allu Ramalingaiah as Ramalingam
Sakshi Ranga Rao as Achary
Bhanu Prakash as Master
Vijayachander as Gopi's friend
Devadas Kanakala as Gopi's friend
Suryakantham as Kanthamma
Santha Kumari as Shantamma
Rukmini as Kaveramma
Meena Kumari as Meena
Sandhya Rani as Kasthuri
Chalapathi Rao

Soundtrack
Music composed by K. V. Mahadevan. The song "Badilo Emundhi" was considered by M. L. Narasimham of The Hindu to sum up the essence of the film.

References

External links 

1960s Telugu-language films
1969 drama films
1969 films
Films directed by Bapu
Films scored by K. V. Mahadevan
Films with screenplays by Mullapudi Venkata Ramana
Indian black-and-white films
Indian drama films
Telugu films remade in other languages